The speckled hind (Epinephelus drummondhayi), also known as the calico grouper, kitty mitchell or strawberry grouper, is a species of marine ray-finned fish, a grouper from the subfamily Epinephelinae which is part of the family Serranidae, which also includes the anthias and sea basses.  It is found in Bermuda and off eastern coast of North America. Its natural habitats are open seas, shallow seas, subtidal aquatic beds, and coral reefs. It is threatened by habitat loss.

Description
The speckled hind has a body which is robust, compressed and is deepest at the origin of the dorsal fin, its standard length is  2.4 to 2.6 times its depth and is equal to the length of the head. The maxilla is exposed when the mouth is closed. The margin of the gill cover bears three flat spines, while the preopercle is serrated  with enlarged spines at its angle. The dorsal fin has 11 spines and 14-16 soft rays while the anal fin contains 3 spines and 9 soft rays. The membrane of the dorsal fin has deep indentations between the spines. The caudal fin is rounded with acutely angled corners. There are 72-76 scales in the lateral line. The background colour of the head and body is dark reddish brown to grey, but it is densely speckled with tiny white spots, these sometimes merge to form a network pattern in larger individuals, the outer part of the pectoral fin is yellowish. The juveniles are bright yellow and are covered in small blue-white spots.

Distribution
The speckled hind is found in the western Atlantic Ocean where it occurs around Bermuda as well as on the eastern coast of the United States where it is found as far north as North Carolina extending south to the Florida Keys and into the Gulf of Mexico as far east as Louisiana, it also occurs off the Yucatan Peninsula. It does not appear to be present in the Bahamas or the Greater Antilles.

Habitat and biology
The juveniles are typically found in shallower waters than the adults. Like other groupers, the specjkled hind is a predatory fish and the prey taken includes other fishes, crustaceans such as crab, shrimp and lobsters as well as molluscs such as squid. They are protogynous hermaphrodites and gather in aggregations to spawn.

Taxonomy
The speckled hind was first formally described as Epinephelus drummondhayi by the American ichthyologists George Brown Goode (1851-1896) and Tarleton Hoffman Bean (1846-1916) in 1878 with the type locality given as Pensacola in Florida. The specific name honours the Scottish officer in the British Army and ornithologist, Lieutenant-Colonel Henry Drummond-Hay (1814-1896), originally of Perth, Scotland, who discovered the species on Bermuda. Since 2018 some authorities have placed this species in the genus Hyporthodus

Utilisation
Speckled hind are taken as bycatch by commercial fisheries for other species of grouper and snapper off the United States coasts. It is targeted by recreational fisheries too. There is a bag limit for both commercial and recreational fisheries in the United States is one fish per vessel per trip. However, the species is still overfished and this may be because of bycatch being returned to the sea after being injured in the process of being taken.

References

Epinephelus
Fish described in 1878
Taxonomy articles created by Polbot